Forrest Ward (born January 11, 1949) is a retired amateur heavyweight boxer.

Early life
Ward was born in Brooklyn, New York in 1949.

Amateur career

In 1966 Ward won the New York Golden Gloves 175-lb Open Championship by defeating Houston Williams of the Police Athletic League Howard Houses in the finals. In 1967 Ward won the New York Golden Gloves Heavyweight Open Championship after beating Thomas Connelly in the finals.  Later that year Ward won the Pan American Heavyweight Championship. Ward won the 1967 National AAU Heavyweight Championship, beating Clay Hodges by a split decision in the semifinals and Ken Norton in the finals.

Pro career
Ward had a disappointing and short career as a professional, which began in 1967 after a banner year as an amateur propelled him to professional territory. After six professional fights, he stepped up in class to face Chuck Wepner in 1968 and lost after being dropped three times in the 7th round, triggering a three knockdown stoppage.  After four consecutive wins, he faced Bill Drover and lost via a technical knockout. Ward retired after the loss.

References

External links
 

1949 births
Sportspeople from Brooklyn
Boxers from New York City
Heavyweight boxers
Winners of the United States Championship for amateur boxers
Living people
American male boxers
Boxers at the 1967 Pan American Games
Pan American Games gold medalists for the United States
Pan American Games medalists in boxing
Medalists at the 1967 Pan American Games